Emese Kőhalmi (born 31 May 2002) is a Hungarian sprint canoeist.

Career
She competed at the 2021 ICF Canoe Sprint World Championships, winning a gold medal in the K-1 5000 m distance.

References

External links

2002 births
Living people
Hungarian female canoeists
ICF Canoe Sprint World Championships medalists in kayak
21st-century Hungarian women